Julieta Franco is an Argentine field hockey player. In February 2012 she was called to be part of the Argentina women's national field hockey team for her first time to train for the 2012 Summer Olympics, and later was chosen as an alternate player (P accreditation).  The Argentine team went on to win the silver medal.

References

External links 
 

Living people
Argentine female field hockey players
1977 births
Field hockey players at the 2012 Summer Olympics
Olympic field hockey players of Argentina
Sportspeople from Buenos Aires Province
20th-century Argentine women
21st-century Argentine women